Julianne Zussman (born January 23, 1987) is a Canadian rugby union player and referee. She represented  at three World Cups. She was named as fullback on the dream team of the 2014 Women's Rugby World Cup. In 2016, she was the recipient of the Gillian Florence Award from Rugby Canada. She is the assistant coach of the University of Victoria women's rugby program.

Zussman attended McGill University, where she attained a Bachelor of Arts degree in international development. During university she was named the RSEQ rookie-of-the-year in 2004 and an all-conference status in 2005. She completed her Masters in Sport Administration (MSA) at the AISTS in Switzerland.

Zussman has played rugby for the Town of Mount Royal RFC and the Castaway Wanderers.

References

External links
 Rugby Canada Player Profile 

1987 births
Living people
Canadian female rugby union players
Canada women's international rugby union players
Sportspeople from Ottawa